John McMahon  was  a former Australian rules footballer who played with Geelong in the Victorian Football League (VFL).		
		
A tall ruckman from Bairnsdale, he was recruited as a 17-year-old in 1953.  He returned to his father's farm in Bairnsdale in 1956, after playing 36 games for Geelong in three seasons, and continued to play for Bairnsdale Football Club in the Gippsland Football League.

Notes

External links 
		

1935 births
2002 deaths
Australian rules footballers from Victoria (Australia)
Geelong Football Club players
Bairnsdale Football Club players